An SSH client is a software program which uses the secure shell protocol to connect to a remote computer. This article compares a selection of notable clients.

General

Platform 
The operating systems or virtual machines the SSH clients are designed to run on without emulation include several possibilities:

 
 Partial indicates that while it works, the client lacks important functionality compared to versions for other OSs but may still be under development.
 

The list is not exhaustive, but rather reflects the most common platforms today.

Technical

Features

Authentication key algorithms
This table lists standard authentication key algorithms implemented by SSH clients. Some SSH implementations include both server and client implementations and support custom non-standard authentication algorithms not listed in this table.

See also 
 Comparison of SSH servers
 Comparison of FTP client software
 Comparison of remote desktop software

References 

Cryptographic software
Internet Protocol based network software
SSH clients
Secure Shell